Mawupemon Otogbe (born 23 January 2003) is a Togolese swimmer. He competed in the men's 50 metre freestyle at the 2020 Summer Olympics.

References

External links
 

2003 births
Living people
Togolese male swimmers
Olympic swimmers of Togo
Swimmers at the 2020 Summer Olympics
Place of birth missing (living people)
African Games competitors for Togo
Swimmers at the 2019 African Games
21st-century Togolese people